Sedum eastwoodiae is a rare species of flowering plant of the stonecrop Crassulaceae family. It is known by its common name Red Mountain stonecrop. It is endemic to Mendocino County, California, where it is known from only four occurrences on Red Mountain, near Ukiah. The total number of plants in existence is estimated to be around 5300. They can be found on steep, exposed, rocky mountain slopes of serpentine substrate. This species has also been treated as a subspecies of Sedum laxum.

Description
Sedum eastwoodiae is a small perennial succulent plant forming basal rosettes a few centimeters wide. The leaves are 1 to 3 centimeters long with the widest part near the distal end, then narrowing to a rounded or slightly notched tip. Smaller leaves occur farther up the stem. The foliage is blue-green in color, blushing reddish. The inflorescence is a spreading or flat-topped array of many small, star-shaped flowers with red or pink petals up to a centimeter long each, and stamens with red or purplish anthers.

Habitat
This species is known from a small section of habitat on a single mountain where the main potential threat to its existence is mining for nickel, chromium, and cobalt.

References

External links
Jepson Manual Treatment: Sedum eastwoodiae
USDA Plants Profile: Sedum eastwoodiae
Sedum eastwoodiae Photo gallery
USFWS Description and Photos

eastwoodiae
Endemic flora of California
Critically endangered flora of California
Taxa named by Alwin Berger
Taxa named by Nathaniel Lord Britton